Sekhamir Kalay is a village and the center of Gurbuz District, Khost Province, Afghanistan.

See also
 Khost Province

References

External links

Populated places in Khost Province